Picocoraciae is a clade that contains the order Bucerotiformes (hornbills and hoopoes) and the clade Picodynastornithes (containing birds like kingfishers and rollers, and woodpeckers and toucans) supported by various genetic analysis and morphological studies. While these studies supported a sister grouping of Coraciiformes and Piciformes, a large scale, sparse supermatrix has suggested alternative sister relationship between Bucerotiformes and Piciformes instead.

References

Neognathae